The World of Books was an English language monthly magazine published by JS Furnivall and later by the Burma Education Extension Association. It spawned off a sister Burmese language monthly Ganda Lawka

References

Bibliography
 

Burmese magazines